Telipna hollandi is a butterfly in the family Lycaenidae. It is found in Cameroon, Equatorial Guinea, Gabon, the Republic of the Congo, the Central African Republic and the Democratic Republic of the Congo.

Subspecies
Telipna hollandi hollandi (north-eastern Democratic Republic of the Congo)
Telipna hollandi exsuperia Hulstaert, 1924 (Cameroon, Equatorial Guinea, Gabon, Congo, Central African Republic, Democratic Republic of the Congo)

References

Butterflies described in 1921
Poritiinae